The Didaktik was a series of 8-bit home computers based on the clones of Intel 8080 and Zilog Z80 processors produced by Didaktik in Skalica, in the former Czechoslovakia.

Initially the company produced PMD 85 compatible machines aimed at schools, then switching to the home market with ZX Spectrum clones.

Didaktik's glory diminished with the falling price of the 16-bit computers, such as the Atari and Amiga, around the middle of the 1990s until it was finally steam-rolled by the PC soon after. The production of Didaktik computers stopped in the year 1994.

Didaktik Alfa

Didaktik Alfa was produced in 1986, as a "more professional" clone of PMD 85. It featured 2.048 MHz Intel 8080 CPU, 48 KB RAM, 8 KB ROM with built-in BASIC, good keyboard (compared with PMD 85), monitor video output (but no TV output) with 288×256 resolution and four possible colours. Despite some changes in ROM, it was mostly compatible with PMD 85. Didaktik Alfa 1 was a clone of PMD 85-1, Didaktik Alfa 2 of PMD 85-2.

Didaktik Beta

Didaktik Beta was a slightly improved version of previous Didaktik Alfa, having almost identical hardware. Didaktik Alfa and Beta were mostly deployed in schools to replace older PMD 85 computers.

Didaktik Gama

Didaktik Gama was a ZX Spectrum clone with 80 KB RAM divided into two switched 32 KB memory banks and 16 KB of slower RAM containing graphical data for video output, while the size of ROM was 16 KB. A peripheral interface with a 8255 chip was added, providing centronics plotter and printer connections and a Kempston joystick port.

The case was similar to that of the ZX Spectrum+, a grey or black box in A5 size, with a flat plastic keyboard and connectors mounted on the rear side. The Gama uses a standard ULA chip made by Ferranti. All games developed for the ZX Spectrum 48K were generally compatible with this computer. An audio cassette was used as data storage and a TV served as a monitor. It is generally said the Gama was unreachable to buy and there were waiting lists several years long. 

Didaktik Gama was produced in three variants: the first, Gama '87, fixed some bugs in the original ZX Spectrum ROM (thus breaking compatibility with some software) and introduced its own bugs effectively inhibiting the use of the second 32 KB memory bank from BASIC. Gama '88 fixed the original ZX Spectrum bugs in a more compatible way, and also fixed the memory switching bug. The final and the more compatible model was Gama '89. 

The computer was expensive but available on the market and could be purchased in Czechoslovak currency outside specialized Tuzex stores, unlike other foreign home computers. Production of Didaktik Gama computers ceased in 1992.

Didaktik M

The Didaktik M introduced in 1990, was cheaper and simple in design than the Gama. The case was more modern, with an ergonomic-like shape and separate arrow keys (however, the keyboard was of poorer quality). Inside there was only 64 KB of total memory (16 KB ROM and 48 KB RAM) which was a disappointment in comparison to the Gama. 

The computer was considerably redesigned. Instead of the original ULA, a custom circuit from Russian company Angstrem was used, giving a square screen aspect ratio, instead of a typical 4:3 rectangle. In addition, the whole RAM was implemented by a single set of 64 KB chips, from which only 48 KB were used. There was no difference between fast and slow memory regarding video content. System timings were different to the original ZX Spectrum, which prevented some software from displaying timing dependent visual effects. 

There were two separated connectors for joysticks and one connector for additional hardware, such as a printer interface. Unlike the previous version of Didaktik, these connectors were typical "socialistic solution", with no compatible peripherals available in the ČSSR. Thus, users were forced to develop and produce various and sometimes funny home-made interfaces to satisfy their needs.

A 5.25-inch floppy disk drive, called D40, was introduced in 1992 and featured a "Snapshot" (see hibernation) button that allowed to store current memory contents on diskette. It was then possible to later load this memory image and continue the software from its previous state.

A 3.5-inch floppy disk drive, called D80, was also introduced later in 1992, simultaneously to the release of the Didaktik Kompakt.

Didaktik Kompakt
The Didaktik Kompakt from 1992 was basically a Didaktik M with a built-in 3.5-inch 720 KB floppy drive and a parallel printer port.

References

External links

 Didaktik computers
 Didaktik computers on old-computers.com 
 PCB scans
 A schematic including the inside of the modulator
 Didaktik družstvo Skalica the website of the company 
 Т34ВГ1 an article in the Russian Wikipedia about the Russian ULA replacement 

Computer-related introductions in 1986
Home computers
ZX Spectrum clones
Science and technology in Czechoslovakia